is a town located on the island of Nishinoshima, in Oki District, Shimane Prefecture, Japan. As of June 2013, the town had an estimated population of 2,923 and a population density of 52 persons per km².

Geography
Nishinoshima occupies all of the island of Nishinoshima, in the Oki Islands archipelago in the Sea of Japan, along with a number of offshore uninhabited islands and rocks. Much of the town is within the borders of Daisen-Oki National Park.

Climate
Nishinoshima has a humid subtropical climate (Köppen climate classification Cfa) with very warm summers and cool winters. Precipitation is abundant throughout the year.

History
Nishinoshima was part of ancient Oki Province, and is the location of a number of Shinto shrines dating to the early Heian period. Nishinoshima, along with Ama and Okinoshima Town claim to be the location of the home-in-exile for ex-emperors Go-Toba and Go-Daigo.

After the Meiji restoration, the Oki Islands became part of Tottori Prefecture in 1871, but were transferred to Shimane Prefecture in 1881. 
The island was divided between Urago Village in the west and Kuroki Village in the east in 1904. The two municipalities were divided by a canal in 1915, which cut the island into two parts. Urago became a town in November 1946 and merged with Kuroki in 1957 to form Nishinoshima Town. The two portions of the island were joined together by a bridge in 2005.

Culture
Nishinoshima's traditional performance art Shūhairā was designated as an Important Intangible Folk Cultural Property by the Japanese government.

Economy
The town economy is primarily based on agriculture and commercial fishing.

References

External links
 
  

Towns in Shimane Prefecture
Populated coastal places in Japan
Islands of Shimane Prefecture
Global Geoparks Network members
Geoparks in Japan
Islands of the Sea of Japan